Isturgia dislocaria, the pale-veined isturgia moth, is a species of geometrid moth in the family Geometridae. It  first described by Alpheus Spring Packard in 1876 and it is found in North America.

The MONA or Hodges number for Isturgia dislocaria is 6419.

References

Further reading

External links

 

Macariini
Articles created by Qbugbot
Moths described in 1876